Kuratowski's free set theorem, named after Kazimierz Kuratowski, is a result of set theory, an area of mathematics. It is a result which has been largely forgotten for almost 50 years, but has been applied recently in solving several lattice theory problems, such as the congruence lattice problem.

Denote by  the set of all finite subsets of a set . Kuratowski published in 1951 the following result, which characterizes the infinite cardinals of the form .

The theorem states the following. Let  be a positive integer and let  be a set.

For , Kuratowski's free set theorem is superseded by Hajnal's set mapping theorem.

References 
 P. Erdős, A. Hajnal, A. Máté, R. Rado: Combinatorial Set Theory: Partition Relations for Cardinals, North-Holland, 1984, pp. 282–285.  
 C. Kuratowski, Sur une caractérisation des alephs, Fund. Math. 38 (1951), 14–17.
 John C. Simms (1991) "Sierpiński's theorem",  Simon Stevin  65: 69–163.

Set theory